Chapoli is a village in Belgaum district in the southern state of Karnataka, India. It is located amid thick and dense Western ghat forest infested with leopards, bears and other wild animals.

References

Villages in Belagavi district